The Gothenburg City Hall is located in Gothenburg, Sweden. It was designed in the Beaux-Arts style and was used primarily as a law court until 2010.

The older building was built circa 1670. The architect was Nicodemus Tessin the Elder. The newer part was finished in 1936 after the design and supervision by architect Gunnar Asplund.

External links

Listed buildings in Gothenburg
Beaux-Arts architecture
Neoclassical architecture in Sweden
City and town halls in Sweden